The 2014–15 Dynamo season was the club's 24th Ukrainian Premier League season, and their first season under manager Serhii Rebrov. During the season, Dynamo competed in the Ukrainian Premier League, Ukrainian Cup and UEFA Europa League.

Squad

Out on loan

Retired number(s)

12 –  Club Supporters (the 12th Man)

Transfers

Summer

In:

Out:

Winter

In:

Out:

Competitions

Ukrainian Premier League

Results summary

Results by round

Results

League table

Ukrainian Cup

Final

Europa League

Group stage

Knockout phase

Squad statistics

Appearances and goals

|-
|colspan="14"|Players who left Dynamo Kyiv on loan during the season :
|-
|colspan="14"|Players who left Dynamo Kyiv during the season :

|}

Goalscorers

Disciplinary record

Notes
Notes

References

External links
Official website

Dynamo Kyiv
FC Dynamo Kyiv seasons
Dynamo Kyiv
Ukrainian football championship-winning seasons